Shaunagh Craig (born 5 April 1993) is a netball player who has represented both Northern Ireland and England at international level. She played for Northern Ireland at the 2019 Netball World Cup. She also helped Hertfordshire Mavericks and Team Bath win Netball Superleague titles in 2011 and 2013 respectively.

Early life, family and education
Craig was born Bedford, England. Both of her parents were originally from Northern Ireland. She completed her secondary level education at Sharnbrook Upper School. Between 2012 and 2016 Craig attended the University of Bath on a sports scholarship and graduated with a BSc in Sports Performance.

Playing career

Clubs

Hertfordshire Mavericks
Between 2010 and 2012 Craig played for Hertfordshire Mavericks. She was a member of the Mavericks squad that won the 2011 Netball Superleague title.

Team Bath
Between 2012 and 2016, while attending the University of Bath, Craig played for Team Bath. She was a member of the Team Bath squad that won the 2013 Netball Superleague title. At the end of the 2015 season, Craig was named the Supporters' Player of the Year after gaining 32% of the vote in an online poll.

Belfast Ladies
When the Northern Ireland squad was announced for the 2019 Netball World Cup, Craig was listed as a Belfast Ladies player.

International

England
Craig represented England at under-17, under-19, under-21 and  A levels. At the 2013 European Netball Championship, Craig was a member an under-21 squad that represented England in the senior tournament. She was selected for the 2015 Netball World Cup England squad but subsequently had to withdraw because of an injury.

Northern Ireland
Craig was selected to represent Northern Ireland at the 2019 Netball World Cup.
In the opening game against Australia, Craig scored 18 of Northern Ireland's 24 goals.

Employment
Between 2014 and 2015, while also attending the University of Bath, Craig worked as a development coach for England Netball. Between 2017 and 2018 she worked as a sports manager at Takapuna Grammar School. Between 2018 and 2019 she worked as a volunteer community organiser at the Corrymeela Community.
In 2019 Craig began working as a service manager in Gloucester for BeeZee Bodies, a company promoting healthy lifestyles.

Honours
Team Bath
Netball Superleague
Winners: 2013: 1
Hertfordshire Mavericks
Netball Superleague
Winners: 2011: 1 
England
European Netball Championship
Runners Up: 2013 : 1

References

1993 births
Living people
Northern Ireland netball internationals
English netball players
2019 Netball World Cup players
Netball Superleague players
Mavericks netball players
Team Bath netball players
People educated at Sharnbrook Academy
Alumni of the University of Bath
People from Bedford
Sportspeople from Bedfordshire
English netball coaches